Fortune And Maltese are an American garage rock band from Detroit, Michigan, formed in 1993 in Kalamazoo, Michigan.

History
One of the early groups to define the Garage Rock revival in Detroit and the United States, Fortune & Maltese (a/k/a Fortune and Maltese and The Phabulous Pallbearers) are a five-piece Detroit-based garage band. Formed in 1993 in Kalamazoo & Ann Arbor, MI by Michael Maltese, Freddy Fortune, Nat Cromlech, Dusty Sexton and J.C. Graves, they have toured The United States, Europe and Canada with their particular brand of 1960s-influenced music and have been featured in the films "It Came From Detroit" and on the soundtrack to the Russ Meyer-homage "Pervert ".

In November 2010 Fortune and Maltese were named "No. 35" in their "Detroit's Greatest Hits That Should Have Been" list with their single "Leave No Stone Unturned" / "Time Has Gone" (Get Hip) 1997.

In 2013 Freddy Fortune and Michael Maltese appeared with other Detroit musicians as Benedict Arnold & The Traitors to play in San Diego with Paul Revere & The Raiders' front man Mark Lindsay at the Ugly Things Magazines 30th Anniversary Celebration

Partial discography

Singles and EPs (7")
1.  No Dice 7" (Leppotone & Happy Hour Records, 1993, LT-003)
1. No Dice (Fortune, Maltese)
2. Fools' Gold (Fortune, Maltese)
3. Take My Word (B. Fuller/M. Stone)
4. Pepsi Commercial (Fortune, Maltese)
5. Wicked Weed (Fortune, Maltese)

2. Wig Wam 7" (Leppotone & Happy Hour Records, 1994, LT-005)
1. Wig Wam Promo/Wig Wam (Fortune, Maltese)
2. Gone, Gone, Gone (D. Everly/P. Everly)
3. Kent Berglund Action Man (Fortune/Maltese)
4. Don't Mind If I Do (Fortune/Maltese)

3. Genie In The Lamp 7" (360 Twist! Records, 1997, 36T-009)
1. Genie In The Lamp (Fortune, Maltese)
2. Vampira (Fortune/Maltese)

4. Leave No Stone Unturned 7" (Get Hip, 1997, GH-212)
1. Leave No Stone Unturned (Fortune/Maltese/Cromlech)
2. Time Has Gone (Fortune/Chan/Kaufman)

5. Bewitched 7" (Larsen Records, 1997, LZ 039)
1. Bewitched (Maltese/Hurtt)
2. Don't Wanna Cry (Andre Siebert)

6. Disk Jockey Promo Record 7" (Hillsdale Records, 1997, HR 018) Sent to disk jockeys only – 300 pressed
1. D.J. Interview w/Fortune & Maltese (Open-ended for Disk Jockey Participation)
2. She's A Blowout (Fortune/Maltese)
3. PSA – Stay In School (Fortune/Maltese)
4. Commercial – Coca-Cola

7. Knaughty Knight 7" (CAD Records, 1999, 45001)
1. Knaughty Knight (Fortune/Maltese)
2. Good-N-Plenty (Fortune/Maltese)

8. Fiddled While Rome Burned 7" (Keystone Record Co., 2000, KEY-2EP)
1. Fiddled While Rome Burned (Fortune/Maltese/Cromlech/Sexton/Graves)
2. Wrong From The Start
3. Mindreader
4. I'm Crying

9. Sonic Sounds From Seattle 7" (Dionysus Records, 2001, ID 0745102)
1. Girl Go Run Away
2. You Watch The Road (Fortune/Maltese)
3. Don't Question Me (Fortune/Maltese/Cromlech/Cromlech/Sexton/Graves)
4. Jump, Jive And Harmonize!

10. Girls Gotta Learn 7" (Get Hip, 2004, GH-231) with Jonny Chan,  Amy Surdu, John Szymanski & Mike Latulippe
1. Girl's Gotta Learn (Maltese)
2. I Hate You Baby (Fortune/Schroeder)
3. Oh Yeah Alright (Maltese/Chan)
4. Do What I Want (Fortune/Chan)

LPs & CDs
1. Fortune & Maltese And The Phabulous Pallbearers LP 1996 (Screaming Apple Records, SCALP 110)
1. Wig Wam Promo/Wig Wam (Fortune/Maltese)
2. No Dice (Fortune/Maltese)
3. Fools' Gold (Fortune/Maltese)
4. Gone, Gone, Gone (D. Everly/P. Everly)
5. Wicked Weed (Fortune/Maltese)
6. Take My Word (B. Fuller/M. Stone)
7. Don't Mind If I Do (Fortune/Maltese)
8. Kent Berglund Action Man (Fortune/Maltese)
9. Let's Dance (J. Lee)
10. Bamboozled Again (Fortune/Maltese)
11. Low Man (On Her Totem Pole) (Fortune/Maltese)
12. Try A Little Harder (Fortune)
13. I Just Don't Care (Fortune/Maltese)
14. Chase You (P. Katrich/T. Conway)
15. I Found A New Love (Nehring/Marusak)
16. Golden Arm (Fortune/Maltese)
17. The Bummer (Martin/Ruiz)
18. Black Hood (Maltese/Cromlech/Sexton/Cornfinger)

2. Fortune & Maltese And The Phabulous Pallbearers CD (Get Hip, GH-1057)
1. Wig Wam Promo (Fortune/Maltese)
2. Wig Wam (Fortune/Maltese)
3. No Dice (Fortune/Maltese)
4. Fools' Gold (Fortune/Maltese)
5. Gone, Gone, Gone (D. Everly/P. Everly)
6. Wicked Weed (Fortune/Maltese)
7. Take My Word (B. Fuller/M. Stone)
8. Don't Mind If I Do (Fortune/Maltese)
9. Kent Berglund Action Man (Fortune/Maltese)
10. Let's Dance (J. Lee)
11. Bamboozled Again (Fortune/Maltese)
12. Low Man (On Her Totem Pole) (Fortune/Maltese)
13. Try A Little Harder (Fortune)
14. I Just Don't Care (Fortune/Maltese)
15. Chase You (P. Katrich/T. Conway)
16. I Found A New Love (Nehring/Marusak)
17. Golden Arm (Fortune/Maltese)
18. The Bummer (Martin/Ruiz)
19. Black Hood (Maltese/Cromlech/Sexton/Cornfinger)
20. Du Toc (Fortune/Maltese) CD BONUS CUT
21. Louise (J.L. Kincaid) CD BONUS CUT

3. Konquer Kampus LP/CD 1996 (Hillsdale Records, HLP-103)
1. If Push Comes To Shove (Fortune/Maltese)
2. My Baby's Hearse (Fortune/Maltese)
3. Cuttin' Class (Fortune/Maltese)
4. Ask The Swami (Fortune/Maltese)
5. She's A Blowout (Fortune/Maltese)
6. Let's All Go To The Science Fair (Fortune/Maltese)
7. Study Break (Fortune/Maltese)
8. Tappa Kegga USA (Fortune/Maltese)
9. Tally Ho (Fortune/Maltese)
10. Girls Ruin Everything (Maltese)
11. Truth Serum (Fortune/Maltese/Cromlech)
12. Pizza Party Twist (Fortune/Maltese)
13. Cuz I Want You Yeah I Need You (Fortune/Maltese)
14. High Horse (Fortune/Maltese/Cromlech)
15. Stay In School Promo (Fortune/Maltese)

4. LIVE AT HARVEY'S, 18 cuts (Dutch bootleg of live set w/prev. unreleased F&M bonus cuts...)
1. The Bummer
2. No Dice
3. Wig Wam
4. Fool's Gold
5. Kent Berglund Action Man
6. Don't Mind If I Do
7. Ballad Of A Useless Man
8. I Found A New Love
9. **Radio Amsterdam Interview**
10. Just Don't Care
11. Try It
12. Wicked Weed
13. Low Man On Her Totem Pole
14. Golden Arm
15. Bewitched
16. Action Woman
17. Dirty Old Man
18. Chevy Man (Studio Acetate)

Compilations
1. TransWorld Garage Scene Volume 2 LP (Misty Lane, 1996, MISTY 033)
1 I Just Don't Care (Fortune/Maltese)

2. Splitsville Confidential 7" (Splitsville Records, 1997, U-43423)
1 track: Louise (Paul Revere & The Raiders)

3. Our Favorite Texan: Bobby Fuller Four-Ever! CD (#9 Records JAPAN, 1999 & 2000, ZOE-001)
1 track: Pamela

4. Takin' Out the Trash: A Tribute to the Trashmen CD (Double Crown Records, 2000)
2 tracks: Sleeper and King Of The Surf

5. Swingin' Creepers, A Tribute To The Ventures CD (MuSick Recordings, 2000, MuSick 0010)
1 track: The Twomp

6. PERVERT! Original Motion Picture Soundtrack (Infinite Entertainment Records, 2005)
2 tracks: Oh Yeah Alright and No Dice

7. The Sweet Sounds of Detroit CD (Bellyache Records (BR-001) 2006)
1 track: Alice Long (Boyce/Hart)

8. Ghoul's Delight A Monster Party Record 2-CD Set (Bellyache Records (BR-001) 2006)
1 track: Vampira (Fortune/Maltese)

9. The Sweet Sounds of Detroit Volume 2 CD (Bellyache Records (BR-017) 2009)
1 track: Good N Plenty (Fortune/Maltese)

See also
 Frat rock
 Garage punk
 Pub rock (United Kingdom)
 Pub rock (Australia)
 Group Sounds (Japan)
 List of garage rock bands

References

External links
 Cavestones Blog – Fortune And Maltese
 '60's Garage Bands  – Researching the Local and Regional Bands of the 1960s
 25, 2009+19:27:57 Detroit Rock and Roll – Links to Detroit rock from the 1950s to the present.
 Little Steven's Underground Garage – Steve Van Zandt's Garage Rock Radio Station
 Beyond The Calico Wall @ pHinnWeb – Garage rock info and links.
 About.com Profile of Garage Rock – another, slightly different, definition and history of Garage Rock.
 Garage Rock Radio Homepage – Links to and reviews of garage rock radio shows available on the Internet.
Trans-World '60s Punk:Cutie Morning Moon – Japanese Group Sounds and more.
 Discog.com Discogs.com: Fortune & Maltese

Garage rock groups from Michigan
Indie rock musical groups from Michigan
Musical groups established in 1993
1993 establishments in Michigan